Festuca arvernensis (also known as Field fescue) is a species of perennial plant from family Poaceae. It is native to France. It can also be found in such US states as California and New Mexico.

References 

arvernensis
Flora of France
Flora of California
Flora of New Mexico
Flora without expected TNC conservation status